Moschops (Greek for "calf face") is an extinct genus of therapsids that lived in the Guadalupian epoch, around 265–260 million years ago. They were heavily built plant eaters, and they may have lived partly in water, as hippopotamuses do. They had short, thick heads and might have competed by head-butting each other. Their elbow joints allowed them to walk with a more mammal-like gait rather than crawling. Their remains were found in the Karoo region of South Africa, belonging to the Tapinocephalus Assemblage Zone. Therapsids, such as Moschops, are synapsids, the dominant land animals in the Permian period, which ended 252 million years ago.

Description

They had small heads with broad orbits and heavily-built short necks. Like other members of Tapinocephalidae, the skull had a tiny opening for the pineal organ. The occiput was broad and deep, but the skull was more narrow in the dorsal border. Furthermore, the pterygoid arches and the angular region of the jaw with heavily-built jaw muscles. Due to that and the possession of long-crowned, stout teeth, it is believed that Moschops was a herbivore feeding on nutrient-poor and tough vegetation, like cycad stems. Due to the presumably nutrient-poor food, it is likely they had to feed for long periods of time. The anatomy of the taxa allowed them to open the elbow joints more widely, enabling them to move in a more mammal-like posture than some other animals at the time. This helped to carry their massive bodies more easily while feeding, as well as allowing them short bursts of speed. It has also been proposed that Moschops were possibly sub-aquatic. Moschops had rather thick skulls, prompting speculation that individuals could have competed with one another by head-butting. A 2017 published study would later confirm this by synchrotron scanning a Moschops capensis skull, which revealed numerous anatomical adaptations to the central nervous system for combative behaviour. They were likely preyed upon by titanosuchids and larger therocephalian species.

Earliest finds
Moschops material was discovered for the first time by Robert Broom in the Ecca Group (part of the Karoo Supergroup) in South Africa. The geological horizon dubious, it was referred to that group on the basis of Pareiasaurus remains in near proximity. The material includes a holotype (AMNH 5550) and seven topotypes (AMNH 5551-5557). The degree of pachyostosis varies within the skulls of the specimens. According to Broom, it is because of gender and age variation within the discovered specimens. In 1910, the material was sent to the American Museum of Natural History in New York City and it was described in 1911.

Classification

Moschops is characterized by a strongly pachyostosed skull with a broad intertemporal region and greatly reduced temporal fossae. Two species are known from the fossil record, M. capensis and M. koupensis. Two other species were assigned (M. whaitsi and M. oweni), but their validity is considered possibly dubious.   Genera regarded as synonyms are Moschoides, Agnosaurus, Moschognathus and Pnigalion. Delphinognathus conocephalus could represent juvenile Moschops, thus possibly synonymous. Delphinognathus is only known from a single, moderately pachyostosed skull. It has a conical boss on the parietal surrounding the pineal foramen.

See also

References

External links

Moschops, pictures and a brief overview
Tapinocephalidae at Paleos.com

Tapinocephalians
Prehistoric therapsid genera
Guadalupian synapsids of Africa
Permian South Africa
Fossils of South Africa
Fossil taxa described in 1911
Taxa named by Robert Broom